Pointe La Rue is an administrative district of Seychelles located in the eastern region of the island of Mahé.

The district has an area of 3.9 km2. Its population rose from 3086 (census of 2002) to 3172 (2009 estimate).

The district is the location of Seychelles International Airport, with its runway running along the northeast coast. Anonyme Island and Rat Island are part of the district.

References

Districts of Seychelles
Mahé, Seychelles